Lloyd Barker may refer to:

 Lloyd Barker (criminal, 1897–1949), son of notorious criminal Ma Barker
 Lloyd Barker (umpire) (born 1943), Barbadian cricket umpire
 Lloyd Barker (footballer) (born 1970), Jamaican footballer